CSTM may refer to:

 College of Saint Thomas More, a small liberal arts college located in Fort Worth, Texas.
 Workers' Trade Union Confederation of Mali
 Station code for Mumbai CST